Drum Connection (also known as DC) is a German musical ensemble and pop group. 

The group was founded 1995 by Max van der Rose and had its first gig at the legendary Dance Of Elements. 

Since then Drum Connection has been on international stages of the club, event and industrialscene.
As the main part of the Rhythm, Drum & Dance show they toured through 13 European countries in 2003 and were rewarded with the well-known MBA award 2004. 

Since 2003 the basic unit of the drum connection forms up by the 4 drummers Dirk Erchinger, Enno Kuck, Jan-Peter Eckelmann and Max van der Rose, who are supported at extraordinary events by drummers like Dog Kessler, Tim Kroker, Chriz Falk up to a support group of 10 drummers. 
The drummers play, if they are not touring with Drum Connection, with top acts like Front 242, Micatone, Jazzkantine, Count Basic, Poems for Laila, Medlz, Sedoussa and worked in bands like H-Blockx, Rosenstolz, Poems for Laila, Kruder & Dorfmeister, Ich & Ich and Vanilla Ninja.

Their club concept is ingeniously simple and effective: the drummers lay their rhythm on the basics of the djs, through this they change any style into a new and original element. During their performance they stand behind their huge drum sets which are specially constructed for them.

Throughout October and November 2008, Drum Connection supported German Eurodance group Cascada on their second UK tour - The Perfect Day Tour 2008.

External links
 http://www.drumconnection.net

Fubotv/connect

Musical groups established in 1995
German electronic music groups
Percussion ensembles
German alternative rock groups